Paul Sambo (born January 27, 1976) is a Nigerian Kannywood and Nollywood actor and Filmmaker.

Life
Sambo was born in Bauchi State, Nigeria. He had been married to Lami Daniel since March 2012. The couple was reported by TheInfoNG to have welcomed a baby girl into their family on September 17, 2015. He, however, was reported to be in a serious romance with a TV presenter, Juliet Chidinma Mgborukwe, with whom he was featured in a film at the time.

Career
He was featured as "Mr. Brown" in Ikechukwu Onyeka's 2012 romantic film, Mr. and Mrs., also featuring Nse Ikpe Etim, Joseph Benjamin, Thelma Okoduwa, Paul Apel.

In 2014, he was featured in Stephanie Okereke's film on VVF titled, Dry, which also starred Nollywood's and starring Liz Benson, American actor, William McNamara and British actor, Darwin Shaw.

He was featured in Kemi Adetiba's 2018 political thriller film, King of Boys, also featuring Adesua Etomi, Sola Sobowale, Reminisce, Illbliss, Osas Ighodaro, Omoni Oboli, Akin Lewis.

He was starred in Kenneth Gyang's political thriller TV Series, Sons of the Caliphate, in which he played the role of "Khalifa".

Filmography

References

External links
 Paul Sambo on IMDb
 Paul Sambo on Insidenolly
 2018 Paul Sambo's Movies on Mixtube
 Paul Sambo on Nollywood Reinvented
 Paul Sambo on Flixanda
 Paul Sambo on Nollyland

Living people
People from Bauchi State
Kannywood actors
Nigerian male actors
1976 births
Male actors in Hausa cinema
Nigerian film producers